Jay Henderson (born April 8, 1995) is an American basketball player  who is a shooting guard for Oklahoma City Blue in G-League.

Early life 
Henderson was born on April 8, 1995, in Orlando, Florida. He started playing travel basketball at the age of 8 when he joined the Orlando Raptors.  At age 15, he was invited to play for Nike team Florida at the Nike EYBL league.

Career

High School 
Henderson  played for  his high school team while still in the 6th grade. He played alongside Joel Berry in the backcourt at Lake Highland Prep, winning back-to-back state championships in his junior and senior years.

College 
During his college years, Henderson played college basketball for Saint John's University, under coach Steve Lavin. He later moved to the University of Louisville, where he played alongside Damion Lee and Donovan Mitchell  under  coach Rick Pitino, for two years.

Professional career 
Henderson was invited to play in the NBA Summer League for the Indiana Pacers in the summer of 2019. He got his first professional contract with the Miami Heat G-League affiliate, Sioux Falls Skyforce. At the end of the season, he was signed up as a free agent with the Oklahoma City Blue where he currently plays as a shooting guard.

Awards and recognition 
2022 - Listed among Best performed former University of Louisville players in pro basketball.

References

External links
 Jay Henderson Official website

1995 births
Living people
American basketball players
All-American college men's basketball players
American men's basketball players
Basketball players from Orlando, Florida
Oklahoma City Blue players
Shooting guards